"Surfin'" is a song by American rock band the Beach Boys that was written by Brian Wilson and Mike Love. It was released as the debut record by the Beach Boys (with "Luau" on the B-side) in November 1961 on Candix Records and was included on the October 1962 album Surfin' Safari.

The single effectively began the Beach Boys' music career, establishing them at the vanguard of what was later dubbed the "California sound". It peaked at number 75 in the U.S. and was never released in the UK. The Beach Boys later re-recorded the song for their 1992 album Summer in Paradise. Love re-recorded it for his 2019 solo album 12 Sides of Summer.

Background and authorship
In his book Becoming the Beach Boys (2015), James Murphy prefaces the chapter concerned with "Surfin" with a warning to the reader. Murphy writes that accounts of the events surrounding the conception, making, and release of the song are "addled with errors and incongruities" and have "frustrated music historians and writers for more than fifty years".

In 1960, for his final project at his Hawthorne High music class, Brian Wilson had submitted a 32-measure musical composition instead of the 120-measure piano sonata that his teacher Fred Morgan had requested. In Morgan's recollection, "Instead of writing a sonata, he wrote [a melody that later became] the song called 'Surfin'.'" Thus, Wilson was given a failing grade on the assignment. However, Wilson's mother Audree disputed Morgan's account and contended that the composition had not actually been "Surfin'". Biographer David Leaf writes that the contents of Wilson's submission have since "been lost in time".

All accounts credit Dennis Wilson's interest in surfing with inspiring the choice of subject matter. Brian recalled that his brother had made the suggestion to write a surfing song, after which Brian conceived "Surfin" while repeatedly singing the title line at his piano. In his recollection, it was within hours that he completed the song and titled it "Surfin'". The Wilson brothers' cousin, Mike Love, is credited with contributing the lyrics and the "bom-dip-di-dip" hook, which had been lifted from Jan and Dean's 1959 hit "Baby Talk".

Early rehearsal tapes include an audible remark, from Brian, in which he credits the song to himself, his brothers Carl and Dennis, and Love. Brian is heard saying, "Dennis and Carl got the great idea. Mike and I just got a few ideas." This was followed by an argument over the writing credits, with Dennis remarking, "We all wrote a tremendous amount of words." In a later interview, Dennis stated that he did not contribute to the writing of the song. Murphy states that Al Jardine's involvement, if any, is unclear.

Early rehearsals

In August 1961, Al Jardine contacted Wilson to help record a rendition of "The Wreck of the John B" at Hite and Dorinda Morgan's Stereo Masters studio. Carl, Dennis, and Love then accompanied them on the visit. Jardine said, "That was the pretense in which we went down to the studio. I called Brian and suggested to him we record some folk music." Dorinda recalled that the group auditioned with top 10 pop hits, possibly including "Duke of Earl", but the couple were unimpressed and suggested that the group write some originals. Dennis exclaimed that a surf song had never been tried before.

Dorinda said that the group immediately set about writing "Surfin" and later left the studio with only a rough draft of the song. Love remembered that the group "manufactured an instant surfing song after having spoken to ... Hite Morgan. ... We prevailed upon him saying, 'Give us some time to come up with a song.'" They later returned to Stereo Masters and previewed their new work to the Morgans. They thought the song needed further refinement, but expressed interest in recording it.

Brian's home recordings of the band's rehearsals for "Surfin" at this juncture were later released on Good Vibrations: Thirty Years of the Beach Boys (1993), Hawthorne, CA (2003), and the unauthorized Garage Tapes (2007). Jardine is not audible on these recordings, and it is possible that Wilson intended the recording group to consist only of himself, his brothers, and cousin to match the same family model as the Four Freshmen.

Rented instruments

Around this time, likely in mid–October, the Wilsons' parents, Murry and Audree, vacationed in Mexico City for three days. According to Murphy, "Everything about this trip is controversial—when they went, where they went, how long they stayed, and how much money Murry left with the boys while they were gone."

According to most accounts, which sourced this information from Murry, he and Audrey left their children with the refrigerator stocked, and, if the children chose to eat out, a sum of cash. Reports of the exact sum range from a likely $80 to an unlikely $800. The day after the parents left, the group went down to a music store and rented instruments with their food money. Jardine said, "The story that we used the grocery money, which is a great story, really sounds great in print, [but] it’s not true, cause we all ate the damn grocery money long before we rented the equipment." In reality, the group obtained the funds from Jardine's mother, who loaned them $300.

Brian played guitar, Jardine took standup bass, and Dennis chose drums. Brian said that in order to make a rock and roll sound, he would play bass while Carl played guitar and Mike Love played the saxophone, despite not having any prior experience. David Marks remembered, "I wasn't really in the group then. I was practicing with them, but Al was playing upright bass with the group. I was just their kid friend from across the street going, 'Hey guys, can I play too? Can I, huh, huh?'"

The group set up their music equipment inside the Wilsons' home and held jam sessions while the parents were away. Audree remembered that she and Murry had barely entered the room when the band said they had something to play for the Wilson parents. She recalled, "We saw all this stuff...and they had an act ... and that's when 'Surfin' was born." The band recorded a demo on Brian's Wollensak tape recorder that was later released on the 2001 compilation Hawthorne, CA.

Recording

Early sessions for "Surfin'" were held at the Morgans' studio; however, there is no reliable documentation that would confirm the two exact dates. Although September 15 and October 3 were later offered by the Morgans, these dates are specious. Additionally, there exists a manuscript of the lyrics, handwritten by Brian, that was dated October 12. It lists every member of the group, then called "the Pendletones", whose line-up did not include Jardine or Marks.

In early November, "Surfin'" was recorded in eight takes at World Pacific Studios in Los Angeles, with the final take chosen as the master. Carl said, "We didn't know anything about the sounds or how a record was made. We just lucked out. My dad knew a publisher and we went to a studio and we made a record. And the way it sounded was the way it sounded."

Release

After "Surfin'" was completed,  Hite announced that he was going to transform the song into a record and release it on local radio. According to most accounts, label promotion man Russ Regan renamed the group "the Beach Boys" without approval from the band members. Brian recalled being informed of the decision through a phone call with Regan. Conversely, Love recalled that the group did not know that their name had been changed until after the record was issued, but on another occasion, supported that the group were consulted beforehand and had been unable to devise a better alternative.

"Surfin'"  was released by Candix Records on November 27, 1961. On December 2, the record premiered on KFWB. By the final weeks of 1961, "Surfin" had sold more than 40,000 copies.

Personnel 

Per James Murphy.
Brian Wilson – vocals, snare drum tapped with finger
Dennis Wilson – vocals
Carl Wilson – vocals, acoustic guitar
Mike Love – lead vocals
Al Jardine – vocals, stand-up bass

Some reports incorrectly state that the percussion was played on a pie tin or garbage can lid.

Other versions

 1963 – Jan & Dean, Jan & Dean Take Linda Surfin''' (recorded with the Beach Boys)
 1965 – Annette Funicello, Annette Sings Golden Surfin' Hits  
 1993 – The Surf Rats, Muppet Beach Party''

Charts

Notes

References

Bibliography

External links
 
 

1961 debut singles
1961 singles
The Beach Boys songs
Songs written by Brian Wilson
Songs written by Mike Love
1961 songs
Jan and Dean songs
California Sound